The following 155 representatives were members of the Chilean Constitutional Convention, organ whose relevance in the History of Chile consists in being the first of a democratic kind when drafting a constitution.

These people make up the Constitutional Convention whose goal is draft a new text in replace of the 1980 Constitution. On 15 June 2021, the Tribunal Calificador de Elecciones («Tricel», Election Qualifying Court) released the official list of conventionals.

Reserved seats
Mapuche
 Francisca Linconao (Independent)
 Natividad Llanquileo (Independent)
 Adolfo Millabur (Independent)
 Rosa Catrileo (Independent)
 Victorino Antilef (Independent)
 Alexis Caiguan (Independent)
 Elisa Loncón (Independent)

Rapanui
 Tiare Aguilera Hey (Independent)

Atacameño
 Félix Galleguillos (Independent)

Aimara
 Isabella Mamani (Independent)
 Luis Jiménez Cáceres (Independent)

Quechua
 Wilfredo Bacián (Independent)

Colla
 Isabel Godoy (Independent)

Diaguita
 Eric Chinga (Independent)

Kawashkar
 Margarita Vargas López (Independent)

Yagan
 Lidia González (Independent)

Chango
 Fernando Tirado Soto (Independent)

District 1 
Arica, Camarones, General Lagos y Putre.
 Carolina Videla (Communist Party)
 Pollyana Rivera (Close to Republican Party)
 Jorge Abarca Riveros (Close to Liberal Party)

District 2 
Alto Hospicio, Camiña, Colchane, Huara, Iquique, Pica y Pozo Almonte.
 Hugo Gutiérrez Galvez (Communist Party)
 Álvaro Jofré (Renovación Nacional)
 Alejandra Flores Carlos (Independent)

District 3 
Calama, María Elena, Ollagüe, San Pedro de Atacama, Tocopilla, Antofagasta, Mejillones, Sierra Gorda y Taltal.
 Cristina Dorador (Independent)
 Dayana González (The List of the People)
 Pablo Toloza (UDI)
 Hernán Velásquez (Social Green Regionalist Federation)

District 4 
Chañaral, Copiapó, Diego de Almagro, Alto del Carmen, Caldera, Huasco, Freirina, Tierra Amarilla y Vallenar.
 Ericka Portilla (Communist Party)
 Constanza San Juan (Independent)
 Guillermo Namor Kong (Independent)
 Maximiliano Hurtado (Close to Socialist Party)

District 5 
Andacollo, La Higuera, La Serena, Paihuano, Vicuña, Coquimbo, Ovalle, Río Hurtado, Canela, Combarbalá, Illapel, Los Vilos, Monte Patria, Punitaqui y Salamanca.
 Ivanna Olivares (Independent)
 Jeniffer Mella (Independent)
 Carlos Calvo Muñoz (Socialist Party)
 Daniel Bravo Silva (Independent)
 Roberto Vega Campusano (Renovación Nacional)
 María Trinidad Castillo (Independent)

District 6 
Cabildo, La Calera, Hijuelas, La Cruz, La Ligua, Nogales, Papudo, Petorca, Puchuncaví, Quillota, Quintero, Zapallar, Calle Larga, Catemu, Llay-Llay, Los Andes, Panquehue, Putaendo, Rinconada, San Esteban, San Felipe, Santa María, Limache, Olmué, Quilpué y Villa Alemana.
 Carolina Vilches (Commons)
 Mariela Serey (Social Convergence)
 Lisette Vergara (The List of the People)
 Ruggero Cozzi (Renovación Nacional)
 Janis Meneses (The List of the People)
 Claudio Gómez (Socialist Party)
 Cristóbal Andrade (The List of the People)
 Miguel Ángel Botto (Independent)

District 7 
Isla de Pascua, Juan Fernández, Valparaíso, Concón, Viña del Mar, Algarrobo, Cartagena, Casablanca, El Quisco, El Tabo, San Antonio y Santo Domingo.
 Jaime Bassa (Close to Social Convergence) 
 Jorge Arancibia (Independent to Republican Party)
 Camila Zárate Zárate (The List of the People)
 Agustín Squella (Independent to Liberal Party)
 Tania Madriaga (The List of the People)
 Raúl Celis Montt (Renovación Nacional)
 María José Oyarzún (Democratic Revolution)

District 8 
Colina, Lampa, Quilicura, Pudahuel, Til Til, Cerrillos, Estación Central y Maipú.
 Daniel Stingo (Democratic Revolution)
 Bernardo de la Maza (Close to Evópoli)
 Marco Arellano (Close to The List of the People)
 María Rivera (The List of the People)
 Valentina Miranda (Communist Party)
 Tatiana Urrutia (Democratic Revolution)
 Bessy Gallardo (Close to Progressive Party)

District 9 
Conchalí, Huechuraba, Renca, Cerro Navia, Lo Prado, Quinta Normal, Independencia y Recoleta.
 Rodrigo Logan (Party of the People)
 Bárbara Sepúlveda Hales (Communist Party)
 Natalia Henríquez (The List of the People)
 Alejandra Pérez Espina (The List of the People)
 Arturo Zúñiga (Unión Demócrata Independiente)
 César Valenzuela Maass (Socialist Party)

District 10 
Santiago, Ñuñoa, Providencia, La Granja, Macul y San Joaquín.
 Fernando Atria (Democratic Revolution)
 Teresa Marinovic (Close to Republican Party
 Patricia Politzer (Non-Neutral Independents)
 Jorge Baradit (Close to Socialist Party)
 Cristián Monckeberg (Renovación Nacional)
 Manuel Woldarsky (The List of the People)
 Giovanna Roa (Democratic Revolution)

District 11 
Las Condes, Lo Barnechea, Vitacura, La Reina y Peñalolén.
 Marcela Cubillos (Unión Demócrata Independiente)
 Hernán Larraín Matte (Evópoli)
 Constanza Schönhaut (Social Convergence)
 Constanza Hube (Unión Demócrata Independiente)
 Bernardo Fontaine (Close to Renovación Nacional)
 Patricio Fernández (Close to Liberal Party)

District 12 
La Florida, Puente Alto, La Pintana, Pirque y San José de Maipo.
 Benito Baranda (Close to Non-Neutral Independents)
 Beatriz Sánchez (Close to Democratic Revolution)
 Alondra Carrillo (Independent)
 Giovanna Grandón (The List of the People)
 Manuel José Ossandón Lira (Renovación Nacional)
 Juan José Martin Bravo (Non-Neutral Independents)

District 13 
El Bosque, La Cisterna, San Ramón, Lo Espejo, Pedro Aguirre Cerda y San Miguel.
 Malucha Pinto (Socialist Party)
 Ingrid Villena (The List of the People)
 Rodrigo Rojas Vade (The List of the People)
 Marcos Barraza (Communist Party)

District 14 
Buin, Calera de Tango, Paine, San Bernardo, Alhué, Curacaví, El Monte, Isla de Maipo, María Pinto, Melipilla, Padre Hurtado, Peñaflor, San Pedro y Talagante.
 Ignacio Achurra (Social Convergence) 
 Francisco Caamaño Rojas (The List of the People)
 Renato Garín (Radical Party)
 Paulina Valenzuela (Non-Neutral Independents)
 Claudia Castro Gutiérrez (Unión Demócrata Independiente)

District 15 
Rancagua, Codegua, Coinco, Coltauco, Doñihue, Graneros, Machalí, Malloa, Mostazal, Olivar, Quinta de Tilcoco, Rengo y Requínoa.
 Loreto Vallejos (The List of the People)
 Alvin Saldaña (Independent)
 Carol Bown (Unión Demócrata Independiente)
 Matías Orellana (Socialist Party)
 Damaris Abarca (Social Convergence)

District 16 
Chimbarongo, Las Cabras, Peumo, Pichidegua, San Fernando, San Vicente de Tagua Tagua, Chépica, La Estrella, Litueche, Lolol, Marchihue, Nancagua, Navidad, Palmilla, Paredones, Peralillo, Pichilemu, Placilla, Pumanque y Santa Cruz.
 Ricardo Neumann (Unión Demócrata Independiente)
 Nicolás Núñez Gangas (Independent)
 Gloria Alvarado (The List of the People)
 Adriana Cancino (Socialist Party)

District 17 
Curicó, Hualañé, Licantén, Molina, Rauco, Romeral, Sagrada Familia, Teno, Vichuquén, Talca, Constitución, Curepto, Empedrado, Maule, Pelarco, Pencahue, Río Claro, San Clemente y San Rafael.
 Roberto Celedón Fernández (Social Green Regionalist Federation)
 Bárbara Rebolledo (Evópoli)
 María Elisa Quinteros (Independent)
 Alfredo Moreno Echeverría (Unión Demócrata Independiente)
 Christian Viera (Close to Christian Democrat Party)
 Elsa Labraña (The List of the People)
 Paola Grandón (Social Green Regionalist Federation)

District 18 
Colbún, Linares, San Javier de Loncomilla, Villa Alegre, Yerbas Buenas, Cauquenes, Chanco, Longaví, Parral, Pelluhue y Retiro.
 Patricia Labra (Renovación Nacional)
 Francisca Arauna (The List of the People)
 Ricardo Montero Allende (Socialist Party)
 Fernando Salinas Manfredini (The List of the People)

District 19 
Bulnes, Cobquecura, Coelemu, Ñiquén, Portezuelo, Quillón, Quirihue, Ninhue, Ránquil, San Carlos, San Fabián, San Nicolás, Treguaco, Chillán, Chillán Viejo, Coihueco, El Carmen, Pemuco, Pinto, San Ignacio y Yungay.
 Martín Arrau (Unión Demócrata Independiente)
 César Uribe Araya (The List of the People)
 Felipe Harboe (Party for Democracy)
 Carolina Sepúlveda Sepúlveda (The List of the People)
 Margarita Letelier Cortés (Unión Demócrata Independiente)

District 20 
Hualpén, Talcahuano, Chiguayante, Concepción, San Pedro de la Paz, Coronel, Florida, Hualqui, Penco, Santa Juana y Tomé.
 Amaya Alvez (Democratic Revolution)
 Rocío Cantuarias (Close to Evópoli)
 Loreto Vidal (The List of the People)
 Andrés Cruz Carrasco (Close to Socialist Party)
 Tammy Pustilnick (Non-Neutral Independents)
 Bastián Labbé (Independent)
 Luciano Silva Mora (Renovación Nacional)

District 21 
Arauco, Cabrero, Cañete, Contulmo, Curanilahue, Los Álamos, Lebu, Lota, Tirúa, Alto Biobío, Antuco, Laja, Los Ángeles, Mulchén, Nacimiento, Negrete, Quilaco, Quilleco, San Rosendo, Santa Bárbara, Tucapel y Yumbel.
 Vanessa Hoppe (Communist Party)
 Paulina Veloso Muñoz (Renovación Nacional)
 Luis Barceló Amado (Close to Party for Democracy)
 Javier Fuchslocher (Non-Neutral Independents)

District 22 
Angol, Collipulli, Ercilla, Los Sauces, Lumaco, Purén, Renaico, Traiguén, Curacautín, Galvarino, Lautaro, Lonquimay, Melipeuco, Perquenco, Victoria y Vilcún.
 Fuad Chahín (Christian Democratic Party)
 Eduardo Cretton (Unión Demócrata Independiente)
 Ruth Hurtado (Close to Renovación Nacional)

District 23 
Padre Las Casas, Temuco, Carahue, Cholchol, Freire, Nueva Imperial, Pitrufquén, Saavedra, Teodoro Schmidt, Cunco, Curarrehue, Gorbea, Loncoche, Pucón, Toltén y Villarrica.
 Luis Mayol (Renovación Nacional)
 Manuela Royo Letelier (Equality Party)
 Helmuth Martínez (The List of the People)
 Eduardo Castillo Vigouroux (Party for Democracy)
 Lorena Céspedes (The List of the People)
 Angélica Tepper (Close to Renovación Nacional)

District 24 
Corral, Lanco, Máfil, Mariquina, Valdivia, Futrono, La Unión, Lago Ranco, Los Lagos, Paillaco, Panguipulli y Río Bueno.
 Ramona Reyes (Socialist Party)
 Pedro Muñoz Leiva (Socialist Party)
 Felipe Mena Villar (Unión Demócrata Independiente)
 Aurora Delgado (Close to Democratic Revolution)

District 25 
Osorno, San Juan de la Costa, San Pablo, Fresia, Frutillar, Llanquihue, Los Muermos, Puerto Octay, Puerto Varas, Puyehue, Purranque y Río Negro.
 Harry Jürgensen (Renovación Nacional)
 María Cecilia Ubilla (Unión Demócrata Independiente)
 Mario Vargas Vidal (Socialist Party)

District 26 
Calbuco, Cochamó, Maullín, Puerto Montt, Ancud, Castro, Chaitén, Chonchi, Curaco de Vélez, Dalcahue, Futaleufú, Hualaihué, Palena, Puqueldón, Queilén, Quellón, Quemchi y Quinchao.
 Julio Álvarez Pinto (Socialist Party)
 Katerine Montealegre (Unión Demócrata Independiente)
 Adriana Ampuero (The List of the People)
 Gaspar Domínguez (Non-Neutral Independents)

District 27 
Aysén, Cisnes, Chile Chico, Coyhaique, Cochrane, Guaitecas, Lago Verde, Río Ibáñez, O'Higgins y Tortel.
 Tomás Laibe (Socialist Party)
 Geoconda Navarrete (Evópoli)
 Yarela Gómez (Social Convergence)

District 28 
Antártica, Cabo de Hornos, Laguna Blanca, Natales, Porvenir, Primavera, Punta Arenas, Río Verde, San Gregorio, Timaukel y Torres del Paine.
 Mauricio Daza (Independent)
 Rodrigo Álvarez Zenteno (Unión Demócrata Independiente)
 Elisa Giustinianovic (The List of the People)

References

External links
 Detailed list of Conventionals in Radio Cooperativa

Chilean Constitutional Convention
2019–2020 Chilean protests